Andrew "Iceberg" Thomson, (born 7 April 1974), is a retired South African kickboxer.

Biography and career
Thompson was born in East London, South Africa in 1974. Although he played several sports when he was a young boy, he was most interested in body building and martial arts. He studied karate, kickboxing, Muay Thai, kung fu, and boxing.

After graduation he was conscripted into the South African army, where he qualified as a parachutist and a sanitation engineer.

After he moved from East London to Cape Town, he joined Steve's Gym, and he participated in K-1 from 1998 to 2003. He won several K-1 events.

He competed in Enfusion Kickboxing Tournament '13 where he defeated Mate Paulovics on 12 September 2013 in tournament's 1st round. He won by 1st-round TKO after 1 min. and 32 sec and withdraw from the tournament.

Titles 
1999 South African Super Heavyweight Muay Thai Champion
2000 K-1 Africa Grand Prix winner 
2001 K-1 Africa Grand Prix winner
2002 K-1 Africa Grand Prix winner
2006 King of the Ring Pro Heavyweight World Title Runner Up

Professional kickboxing record

|-
|-  bgcolor="#FFBBBB"
| 2015-12-19 || Loss ||align=left| Ismael Lazaar || Enfusion Live 35  || Antwerp, Belgium || KO || 1 || 
|-
! style=background:white colspan=9 |
|-
|-  bgcolor="#CCFFCC"
| 2013-09-12 || Win||align=left| Mate Paulovics || Enfusion 4: Search for the SuperPro, First Round || Ko Samui, Thailand || TKO || 1 || 1:32
|-
|-  bgcolor="#FFBBBB"
| 2002-08-17 || Loss ||align=left| Errol Parris || K-1 World Grand Prix 2002 in Las Vegas, quarter finals || Las Vegas, United States || KO || 1 || 2:59
|-
|-  bgcolor="#CCFFCC"
| 2001-06-08 || Win ||align=left| Timmelo Maputha || K-1 World Grand Prix 2002 Preliminary South Africa, final || Pretoria, South Africa || KO || 2 || 2:00
|-
! style=background:white colspan=9 |
|- 
|-  bgcolor="#CCFFCC"
| 2001-06-08 || Win ||align=left| Hannes Vandenberg || K-1 World Grand Prix 2002 Preliminary South Africa, semi finals || Pretoria, South Africa || KO (Punch) || 1 || 1:50
|-
|-  bgcolor="#CCFFCC"
| 2001-06-08 || Win ||align=left| George Hlatswayo || K-1 World Grand Prix 2002 Preliminary South Africa, quarter finals || Pretoria, South Africa || KO (Punch) || 1 || 
|-
|-  bgcolor="#FFBBBB"
| 2001-07-20 || Loss ||align=left| Alexey Ignashov || K-1 World Grand Prix 2001 in Nagoya, semi finals || Nagoya, Japan || KO (Left Punch) || 1 || 1:46
|-  bgcolor="#CCFFCC"
| 2001-07-20 || Win ||align=left| Cyril Abidi || K-1 World Grand Prix 2001 in Nagoya, quarter finals || Nagoya, Japan || TKO (Referee stoppage) || 1 || 1:15
|-  bgcolor="#CCFFCC"
| 2001-06-08 || Win ||align=left| Paul Rothman || K-1 World Grand Prix 2001 Preliminary South Africa, final || Cape Town, South Africa || TKO || 3 || 0:49
|-
! style=background:white colspan=9 |
|- 
|-  bgcolor="#CCFFCC"
| 2001-06-08 || Win ||align=left| Billy Kongolo || K-1 World Grand Prix 2001 Preliminary South Africa, semi finals || Cape Town, South Africa || KO || 1 || 1:22
|-
|-  bgcolor="#CCFFCC"
| 2001-06-08 || Win ||align=left| Martin Roodman || K-1 World Grand Prix 2001 Preliminary South Africa, quarter finals || Cape Town, South Africa || KO || 1 || 1:43
|-
|-  bgcolor="#FFBBBB"
| 2000-10-09 || Loss ||align=left| Mike Bernardo || K-1 World Grand Prix 2000 in Fukuoka Semi Finals || Fukuoka, Japan || TKO (Doctor Stoppage) || 1 || 0:34
|-
! style=background:white colspan=9 |
|- 
|-  bgcolor="#FFBBBB"
| 2000-10-09 || Loss ||align=left| Stefan Leko || K-1 World Grand Prix 2000 in Fukuoka || Fukuoka, Japan || KO (Right low kick) || 2 || 1:50
|-  bgcolor="#CCFFCC"
| 2000-09-03 || Win ||align=left| Donovan Luff || K-1 Africa Grand Prix 2000, final || Cape Town, South Africa || KO || 3 ||0:16
|-
! style=background:white colspan=9 |
|- 
|-  bgcolor="#CCFFCC"
| 2000-09-03 || Win ||align=left| George Igobi || K-1 Africa Grand Prix 2000, semi finals || Cape Town, South Africa || KO || 1 ||1:05
|-
|-  bgcolor="#CCFFCC"
| 2000-09-03 || Win ||align=left| Mwa George || K-1 Africa Grand Prix 2000, quarter finals || Cape Town, South Africa || TKO (Corner Stoppage) || 1 ||3:00
|-
|-  bgcolor="#FFBBBB"
| 2000-05-12 || Loss ||align=left| Peter Aerts || K-1 King of the Ring 2000 || Bologna, Italy || KO || 1 || 0:55
|-  bgcolor="#FFBBBB"
| 1999-02-03 || Loss ||align=left| Takeru || K-1 Rising Sun '99 || Tokyo, Japan || KO (knee)|| 3 || 1:20
|-  bgcolor="#FFBBBB"
| 1998-08-28 || Loss ||align=left| Mike Bernardo || K-1 Japan Grand Prix '98 || Tokyo, Japan || TKO (Referee Stoppage, Right Straight) || 1 || 3:03
|-
|-
| colspan=9 | Legend:

See also
List of male kickboxers
Muay Thai

References

External links
Official website of Andrew Thomson(Japanese)

1974 births
Living people
South African male kickboxers
Heavyweight kickboxers
South African male karateka
South African Muay Thai practitioners
Sportspeople from East London, Eastern Cape
White South African people